Malšín is a municipality and village in Český Krumlov District in the South Bohemian Region of the Czech Republic. It has about 200 inhabitants.

Administrative parts
The village of Ostrov is an administrative part of Malšín.

References

Villages in Český Krumlov District